Lymire candida is a moth of the subfamily Arctiinae. It was described by William Trowbridge Merrifield Forbes in 1917. It is found on Jamaica and Hispaniola.

References

Euchromiina
Moths described in 1917